Morisawa may refer to:

Organizations 
 , a Japanese photocomposition and type company

Surname 
Fumi Morisawa, Japanese voice actor
Marie Morisawa (1919–1994), US geomorphologist
Sachiko Morisawa (born 1945), Japanese table tennis player

Japanese-language surnames